Phalonidia tenuispiniformis is a species of moth of the family Tortricidae. It is found in China (Beijing, Tianjin).

The wingspan is 12−14 mm. The ground colour of the forewings is pale yellowish white, but yellow from the base to the inner margin of the median fascia. The hindwings are pale grey.

Etymology
The species name refers to the slender spinelike cornutus and is derived from the Latin prefix tenui- (meaning slender) and spiniformis (meaning spinelike).

References

Moths described in 2013
Phalonidia